Ding Jie (Pinyin: Dīng Jié; born April 29, 1987) is a professional Chinese footballer. He currently plays as a midfielder for Shaanxi Chang'an Athletic, on loan from Chongqing Lifan in the China League One.

Club career
Ding Jie was drafted into the senior side of Liaoning FC during the 2005 league season and would make his league debut on September 4, 2005 against Beijing Guoan in a game where he also scored the winning goal in a 3–2 victory. After making his debut he was used sparingly and only started to become a consistent regular during the 2007 league season when he had a personally impressive showing, scoring six goals in nineteen league appearances. Now a regular within the side Ding Jie would unfortunately be part of the squad that saw the club relegated to the second tier at the end of the 2008 league season. Despite this disappointment Ding remained with the club and would immediately aid them in their promotion push that saw the team win the division title and promotion back to the top tier.

On 2 January 2016, Ding transferred to fellow Chinese Super League side Chongqing Lifan.

Career statistics
Statistics accurate as of match played 31 December 2020.

Honours

Club
Liaoning FC	
China League One: 2009

References

External links
 
Player stats at Sohu.com

1987 births
Living people
Chinese footballers
Footballers from Dalian
Liaoning F.C. players
Chongqing Liangjiang Athletic F.C. players
Chinese Super League players
China League One players
Association football midfielders